Miss República Dominicana 2013 was held on August 3, 2013, in Punta Cana's Hard Rock Café Hotel & Casino, Salvaleón de Higüey, Dominican Republic. The winner will represent the Dominican Republic in Miss Universe 2013. The First Runner-Up or "Miss Continentes República Dominicana" will enter Miss United Continent 2013. The Second Runner-Up or "Miss República Dominicana Hispanoamérica" will enter Reina Hispanoamericana 2013. The Third Runner-Up or "Miss Intercontinental República Dominicana" will enter Miss Intercontinental 2013. The Fourth Runner-Up or "Miss Top Model República Dominicana" will enter Top Model of the World 2014.

Results
¤Won Top 13 semifinalist spot by online voting and text messages

Contestants

References

External links
Official website

Miss Dominican Republic
Dominican Republic